Total Eclipse is an American comic book limited series in five prestige format parts published by Eclipse Comics in 1988 to 1989. A cross-company crossover in the style of Crisis on Infinite Earths commemorating the company's tenth anniversary, Total Eclipse was intended to bring all of the company's characters together, no matter how obscure or bizarre, many of whom were acquisitions from defunct Hillman Periodicals. These include Airboy and his Air Fighters, Aztec Ace, Miracleman, The New Wave, Beanworld, the Adolescent Radioactive Black Belt Hamsters, Destroyer Duck and Strike! and Sgt. Strike, while others such as Masked Man, The Heap, Doc Stearn...Mr. Monster, and Ms. Tree make smaller cameo appearances. A one-shot, Total Eclipse: The Seraphim Objective, was also published to tie in with the series.

Creative staff
The title consisted of a main story written by Marv Wolfman (writer of Crisis on Infinite Earths) and drawn by Bo Hampton. In addition to the main art team, numerous others assisted with the art, including Mark Johnson, Thomas Yeates, Sam de la Rosa; Romeo Tanghal, Jim Ritchie, B. C. Boyer, Trina Robbins (who drew a California Girls cameo panel), Terry Beatty, Mark Pacella, Larry Marder (who drew his Tales of the Beanworld characters when they appear), Painted covers were contributed by Bill Sienkiewicz. The issues also included text pieces by Eclipse founder Dean Mullaney covering the then-ten year history of Eclipse. Eclipse editor-in-chief Catherine Yronwode claimed the series would have "a much more realistic threat than any of the other big series have had.". Len Wein was also initially planned to script from Wolfman's story but this did not eventuate. The mini-series was originally announced to consist of six issues, and would be plagued by delays.

Wolfman would later recall "When I took on Total Eclipse, which was Eclipse’s attempt at shoving their universe together, I did it as a favor. I didn’t know or care about the Eclipse universe (aside from selected books which I really did like) and I didn’t have a specific story to tell as I had with Crisis. But I was asked by people I couldn’t say no to, and I did the job. The book was, as is the cliché, a job of work."

Plot summary
Despite many attempts to kill himself or have others killed him the immortal Zzed finds he cannot die by conventional means. Wanting his torment to end, he plans to destroy the universe with a "total eclipse. He and his minions attack the Air Fighters as a distraction while they steal advanced jets from Nelson Aviation. Airboy, Valkyrie and Skywolf give chase and shoot one of them down; his soul is recovered by Misery, who learns of Zzed's involvement. The Airfighters' ally Black Angel meanwhile has been assaulted by strange creatures and saved by the new Prowler, Strike! and Sgt. Strike, and they all meet visiting her in hospital. Misery meanwhile ponders if the events have anything to do with The New Wave, also under attack from Zzed's minions. The immortal plans to destroy the entire universe in order to ensure his own death.
The original Prowler also meets up with Airboy and his allies, while Misery continues to observe from his Air Tomb in order to divine Zzed's motives. He sends the Flying Dutchman to offer an alliance to the heroes, while Zzed recruits the Seraphim. In New Jersey, the New Wave finally succeed in fending off the villain's monsters. Misery appears to them and opens a portal to take them to Airboy. After a brief scuffle brought on by misunderstanding the groups begin to talk, with Misery able to persuade them of the need to band together via the Dutchman. He notes that Zzed is encircling Earth with machines and suggests the growing band of heroes add The Liberty Project to their ranks while he sends The Heap to intercept the Seraphim. After Airboy uses his wealth to get the Liberty Project freed from prison in Pennsylvania he collects the group along with Valkyrie, and eventually persuades them to join the fight. The assemblage attempts to stop Zzed raiding Sci-Plex 3 in the Appalachian Mountains but are unable to prevent him stealing a projector for his machines, and Skywolf is stunned that Zzed is not only able to survive a point-blank hit but then destroy his helicopter. Meanwhile in 1518 Aztec Ace and Bridget discover time is being altered, while on his Earth Miracleman notes mysterious flames.

Miracleman and Miraclewoman investigate the flames outside Olympus, finding them inexplicable. She is uninterested but the mystery bothers him. Meanwhile Nine-Crocodile reveals he has been manipulating Zzed all along from the Six World but - aware that his scheme has now attracted Aztec Ace's attention - sends his Nightgaunt and Ebonati minions after the time-traveller. Meanwhile above the planet the Total Eclipse is coming closer. At Sci-Plex 3, Airboy finally accepts Misery's help in order to save Skywolf's life, with the older Prowler travelling to the Air Tomb with Skywolf as protection while the rest head to a temple Mexico to try and stop the next part of Zzed's plan - unleashing the lens to trigger the Total Eclipse. Aztec Ace recruits Beanish, Destroyer Duck, Miracleman, and the Black Terror. Meanwhile the sky over Earth darkens. Airboy leads the army of heroes to Mexico, where Zzed waits for the beam of the Total Eclipse to pass through the lens and end his life; however, Tachyon blocks it and is seemingly destroyed, while the beam begins to mutate Zed.

The beam causes Zzed to turn into the benign Doctor Eclipse, who leads Miracleman, Avalon, Dot and the other flying heroes to tackle Nine-Crocodile's satellites while Airboy and others fight his minions on the ground as time anomalies grow. In response, Nine-Crocodile talks Misery into an alliance. Meanwhile Aztec Ace leads a contingent to Nine-Crocodile's core world, but Misery tries to lure the heroes into a trap on the Sixth World, the source of the anomalies. They are eventually able to destroy the attackers waiting for them, but Strike! is killed in the process.

Airboy's force have also been led into a trap by Misery, though the arrival of the Adolescent Radioactive Black Belt Hamsters turns the tide in the fight, giving time for Burnout and Crackshot to destroy the attackers with lava. Frustrated at the poor performance of Nine-Crocodile's forces, Misery decides to strike out on his own. Airboy leads an assault to retake the temple, with The Heap now joining the heroes. While they are able to dispose of the guards they find the jewel to be indestructible. Thanks to Misery, Aztec Ace is able to lead his group to directly confront Nine-Crocodile. Doctor Eclipse realises the struggle isn't the real fight and they need to target the satellites instead, leaving Avalon in charge of the group and heading to Mexico to inform the others. Beanish is able to get inside Nine-Crocodile's master machinery, which Miracleman realises has been created using Warpsmith technology. The heroes are able to simultaneously overload the jewel and the machinery. Nine-Crocodile attempts to destroy the Sixth World with everyone on it but the assemblage is able to escape. The day saved, everyone goes back to their usual worlds and times, watched by Misery and Doctor Eclipse.

Interludes
Accompanying the main story were backup stories by various creators featuring Eclipse characters. Issue four is especially notable as it features the first Neil Gaiman-written Miracleman story, with art by Mark Buckingham. The first issue contained a Prowler story by Timothy Truman and Brent Anderson; the second an Aztec Ace story by Doug Moench and Tim Sale; the third a continuation revealing Tachyon's fate after his apparent destruction in the main story, by Steve Gerber and Cynthia Martin; and the fifth an epilogue focusing on the Air Fighters by Chuck Dixon and Stan Woch.

Characters
From Airboy
Airboy: leader of the Air Fighters, David Nelson III has taken up his father's legacy as a hero, and flies a custom aircraft called Birdie.
Valkyrie: a German aviatrix and former lover of David Nelson II, now in love with his son after spending 30 years trapped in Misery's Airtomb.
Skywolf: a former comrade-in-arms of David Nelson II, and now an ally of his son. A World War II veteran, he flies an Apache attack helicopter.
Misery: a villain who feeds on the spirits of lost aviators from his mobile Airtomb.
The Heap: formerly World War I pilot Baron Von Emmelman, who was turned into a swamp monster after his plane crashed in an enchanted bog.
The Flying Dutchman: a deceased pilot now in the thrall of Misery.
Black Angel: Holly McCovey, an ally of the Air Fighters since saving Valkyrie from the Soviet Union.
La Lupina: Marisa Ortega, a mute freedom fighter who fled from Bogantilla and works with the Airfighters in one of Skywolf's old helicopters.  
Iron Eagle: the current identity of Air Fighter Ronald Britain, given a cyborg body by Nelson Aviation after a near-fatal crash.
Hiroto: an enemy of David Nelson II during the Pacific Theater of World War II but now a trusted mentor of the current Airboy.
Zzed: an immortal Cromagnon who fought David Nelson II during World War II and now wants to end his own life at all costs. His body can reform from any damage. He is later struck by a cosmic ray and turned into the heroic and powerful Doctor Eclipse.
From Aztec Ace
Aztec Ace: Caza, a hero based in the past who protects the future via his ACE (Azure Crosstime Express) time machine.
Bridget: Bridget Kronopoulos, a lady from 1940 in a relationship with Caza and sometime Queen of Egypt.
Head: Formerly Caza's assistant and now a disembodied head who controls the ACE.
Nine-Crocodile: Caza's mortal enemy, hell-bent on turning all of reality into limbo.
From Miracleman
Miracleman: a superhuman turned God-on-Earth.
Miraclewoman: Miracleman's lover.
From Strike!
Strike!: Dennis Foreman found the power harness of World War II hero Sgt. Strike and has taken up the mantle.
Sgt. Strike: The original hero, Russell Carlyle has recently returned to Earth following alien abduction in the 1950s.
From The Prowler
Prowler (I): millionaire Leo Kragg became the crime-fighting Prowler decades before.
Prowler (II): art student Scott Kida is an art student chosen by Kragg as his successor.
From The New Wave
Avalon: high school student Elizabeth Lane has inherited druidic abilities.
Impulse: Daniel Barkin is a telekinetic, and Lane's partner.
Tachyon: a super-powered alien bought to Earth by Avalon's father Professor Holmes.
Dot: a former government agent who liberated The New Wave from the Corporation before joining the team.
Polestar: a former circus acrobat who joined The New Wave after meeting Dot.
Megabyte: the mind of a disabled boy put in a high-tech robotic body by the Corporation.
From The Liberty Project
Burnout: teenage delinquent Beatrice Keogh is a powerful pyrokinetic. 
Slick: greedy bank-robber Nicholas Walcek has the ability to remove friction.
Crackshot: scientific genius Lee Clayton has perfect aim, and greatly regrets his criminal past.
Cimarron: Rosalita Vasquez is superhumanly-strong and short-tempered.
From Tales of the Beanworld
Beanish: an artist who produces the Look See Show.
Dreamishness: Beanish's friend.
From Adolescent Radioactive Black Belt Hamsters
Bruce: Bō-wielding expert fighter.
Chuck: quasi-pacifist.
Clint: fun-loving gun nut.
Jackie: young and not inclined towards heroics.
From other titles
The Black Terror: Orrin Murphy, a crime-fighting vigilante.
Destroyer Duck: a foul-mouthed, short-tempered duck trying to get revenge on GodCorp.
Cameos
The Masked Man and sidekick Barney from The Masked Man
Ms. Tree
Radio Boy
Mo and Max from California Girls
Doc Stearn...Mr. Monster

Reception
Andy Mangels of Amazing Heroes found the first issue to be well-written if underwhelming, and disliked the art - preferring The Prowler interlude over the first chapter of Total Eclipse itself. Virginia Williams-Pennick reviewed the second issue, finding it rushed but enjoyable. 
Writing in the New Sunday Times, Daniel Chan noted that the series "lacked the thrill" of earlier crossovers like Crisis on Infinite Earths and Legends.

In a retrospective review for Major Spoilers, Matthew Peterson gave the final issue of Total Eclipse 2.5 stars out of 5, calling it "total chaos, but a fun kind of chaos". Reviewing the comic as part of a re-read of Eclipse's output, Lars Ingebrigtsen noted that "nothing interesting happens in this book" and described Wolfman's attempts to mimic Alan Moore's style in Miracleman as having "er, not very convincing results". Wolfman himself would note that the book "sold about two copies".

External links

References

1988 comics debuts
1989 comics endings
Comic book limited series
Comics about parallel universes
Comics about the end of the universe
Comics about time travel
Comics by Doug Moench
Comics by Kurt Busiek
Comics by Marv Wolfman
Comics by Neil Gaiman
Comics by Steve Gerber
Comics set in Mexico
Defunct American comics
Eclipse Comics titles